John O'Dorman 'Jackie' Hood (born 8 January 1938) is a Scottish retired footballer who played as a centre forward in the Football League for Tranmere Rovers. He had previously been contracted to Everton, and won the Liverpool Senior Cup with their reserve team in 1957.

He is the older brother of former Celtic forward Harry Hood.

References

1938 births
Living people
Footballers from Glasgow
Association football forwards
Scottish footballers
Glasgow United F.C. players
Everton F.C. players
Tranmere Rovers F.C. players
East Fife F.C. players
St Roch's F.C. players
English Football League players
Scottish Junior Football Association players
Scottish Football League players